Maria Alexandrovna of Russia (– 24 October 1920) was the fifth child and only surviving daughter of Emperor Alexander II of Russia and Princess Marie of Hesse and by Rhine; she was Duchess of Edinburgh and later Duchess of Saxe-Coburg and Gotha as the wife of Alfred, Duke of Saxe-Coburg and Gotha. She was the younger sister of Alexander III of Russia and the paternal aunt of Russia's last emperor, Nicholas II.

In 1874, Maria married Prince Alfred, Duke of Edinburgh, the second son of Queen Victoria and Prince Albert of Saxe-Coburg and Gotha; she was the only Romanov to marry into the British royal family. The couple had five children: Alfred, Marie, Victoria Melita, Alexandra, and Beatrice. For the first years of her marriage, Maria lived in England. She neither adapted to the British court nor overcame her dislike for her adopted country. She accompanied her husband on his postings as an admiral of the Royal Navy at Malta (1886–1889) and Devonport (1890–1893). The Duchess of Edinburgh travelled extensively through Europe. She visited her family in Russia frequently and stayed for long periods in England and Germany attending social and family events.

In August 1893, Maria became Duchess of Saxe-Coburg and Gotha when her husband inherited the duchy on the death of his childless uncle, Ernest II, Duke of Saxe-Coburg and Gotha. She enjoyed life in Germany, where she became active in cultural endeavours and charitable work. To her daughters she gave every support, but she was critical of her wayward son, Alfred, who died in 1899. Her husband died in 1900 and was succeeded as Duke of Saxe-Coburg and Gotha by his nephew Charles Edward.

In her widowhood, Maria continued to live in Coburg. The outbreak of World War I divided her sympathies. She sided with Germany against her native Russia. Many of her relatives, including her brother Paul and her nephew Nicholas II, were killed during the Russian Revolution, and Maria lost her considerable fortune. After World War I, the Duchy of Saxe-Coburg and Gotha ceased to exist in November 1918. Maria died in 1920 while living under reduced circumstances in exile in Switzerland.

Grand Duchess of Russia

Early life

She was the sixth child and only surviving daughter among the eight children of Emperor Alexander II of Russia and his first wife, Empress Maria Alexandrovna, née Princess Marie of Hesse and by Rhine.
At the time of her birth, her grandfather, Nicholas I, was on the Russian throne and her father was Tsarevich. In 1855, when Maria was seventeen months old, Nicholas I died and her father became the new Russian Emperor. The grand duchess grew up as the only girl with four older brothers and two younger ones. She did not know her only sister, Alexandra, who had died before she was born. Maria Alexandrovna herself almost died from a throat disease at the age of seven.

Maria's childhood was spent in luxury and splendor in the large palaces and country estates owned by the Romanovs. The family's main residence was the sixteen-hundred-room Winter Palace in Saint Petersburg, with another residence at Gatchina, forty miles south. In the summer, the family stayed in Peterhof, a large complex with farms, cottages, and various pavilions on the Gulf of Finland. From the end of the summer until winter, the imperial family moved to Tsarskoye Selo, the royal village, where the Romanovs had the Catherine Palace and Alexander Palace. In the children's island, located in a pond in the park of the Alexander Palace, Maria had her own private little house, off limit to adults, which she used with her brothers as a playhouse. Her father added a farm, built for her enjoyment when she was eight years old.

Maria was beloved by her parents. Her governess Anna Tiutcheva reflected that "the whole family adores this child" and that her parents "shower her with kisses and affection." Empress Marie felt "boundless adoration" for her only surviving daughter. Alexander II enjoyed spending time with her, and he considered her his favorite child. He told Anna Tiutcheva that "almost every evening I come to feed soup to this little cherub. This is the only enjoyable minute of my whole day, the only time when I forget the troubles that weigh upon me." When she was bored with her studies, she would burst into her father's study and interrupt his meetings with his ministers.

Maria had a close relationship with her brothers. Her governess noted that she "cannot stand when someone reprimands any of her brothers. This brings her to the state of real despair." Empress Marie had weak lungs and had to travel constantly to Germany and southern Europe to escape the harsh Russian winters. She often took her three younger children with her on these trips, so Maria became especially close to her two younger brothers, Sergei and Paul.

Surrounded only by brothers, Maria grew up as a tomboy, with an independent character and a strong will. "She is absolutely genuine and never changes in front of strangers," observed her lady in waiting, Anna Tyutcheva (1829–1889), a daughter of the celebrated poet Fyodor Tyutchev, adding that: "She is accustomed to be the center of the world and that everyone yields to her." Tyutcheva described her pupil as "stubborn and uncompromising" commenting that "one cannot treat her roughly or reason with her a lot".

Education

Maria was educated at the Russian court under the strict regime of her governess, Countess Alexandrine Tolstoy. Maria Alexandrovna was the first Russian grand duchess to be raised by English nannies and to speak fluent English. Besides her native Russian, she also became totally proficient in German and French. In August 1867, while the Imperial family was at Livadia Palace, in Crimea, Mark Twain met Maria Alexandrovna and her parents. The famous American writer described her as "blue-eyed, unassuming, and pretty". As many contemporaries did, Twain noticed the influence that the young grand duchess had over her father.

Engagement

Meeting Prince Alfred

During a visit to her maternal relatives, the Princes of Battenberg, at Jugenheim in August 1868, Grand Duchess Maria Alexandrovna, then fourteen years old, met Alfred, Duke of Edinburgh. Prince Alfred, Queen Victoria's second son, was a shy and handsome young man, with a career in the British navy. He was visiting his sister, Princess Alice, who was married to Maria Alexandrovna's first cousin. Alfred's voyage around the world with the Royal Navy kept him away, traveling for the next two years. Maria and Prince Alfred saw each other again in the summer 1871, when Alexander II and his wife visited the Battenbergs again at their schloss, Heiligenberg. The Tsar and his wife were accompanied by seventeen-year-old Maria and her two elder brothers. Alfred also happened to be there, along with the Prince and Princess of Wales. During that summer, Maria and Alfred felt attracted to each other, spending their days walking and talking together. They had a common love of music; Alfred was an enthusiastic amateur violinist, while Maria played the piano. Although they wished to marry, no engagement was announced, and Alfred returned to England.
Their parents were against the match. Alexander II did not want to lose his daughter, to whom he was deeply attached. He presented his daughter's youth as the main obstacle and suggested a waiting period of at least one year before any definitive decision should be taken. The Tsar also objected to a British son-in-law, due to the general anti-English feeling in Russia following the Crimean War. The Tsarina regarded the British customs as peculiar and the English people as cold and unfriendly. She was convinced that her daughter would not be happy there. However, marriage negotiation began in July 1871, only to be stalled in 1872.

Negotiations

Queen Victoria was also against the match. No British prince had ever married a Romanov, and she foresaw problems with Maria's Orthodox religion and Russian upbringing. The Queen considered that Russia was generally "unfriendly" towards Britain. Victoria was also suspicious about Russian moves in the direction of India. The Queen was dismayed, therefore, when she heard that official negotiations had restarted in January 1873. There were rumors going about St Petersburg that Maria Alexandrovna had compromised herself with Prince Golitsyn, the Tsar's aide-de-camp, and her family were anxious to see her settled. Alfred refused to believe those rumors and he was prepared to fight to marry the person he loved. Queen Victoria therefore swallowed her pride and said nothing. Both mothers continued to look for other partners for their children, but Alfred and Maria would not have anyone else. Marie liked neither the Prince of Württemberg nor the Prince of Mecklenburg-Strelitz that were presented to her as alternatives. As the Tsarina failed to find a German prince acceptable for her daughter, a meeting among Alfred, the Tsarina and her daughter took place in Sorrento, Italy in mid April 1873. The reunion did not go as planned because Marie came down with fever and Alfred could spend only a short time with her. That year, there was an Anglo-Russian dispute over the Afghan border. The Queen's ministers thought that a marriage might help to ease the tension between the two countries, if only by putting the monarchs into closer contact with one another.

In June 1873, Tsar Alexander II joined his wife and daughter at Ems, and Alfred was invited to meet them at Jugenheim. Alfred arrived in early July. On 11 July, he asked for Maria Alexandrovna's hand and she accepted him. He was nearly twenty-nine; she was nineteen. He sent a telegram from Germany back to his mother: "Maria and I were engaged this morning. Cannot say how happy I am. Hope your blessing rests on us." The Queen sent her congratulations, but confined her misgivings to her diary on 11 July 1873: "Not knowing Marie, and realizing that there may still be many difficulties, my thoughts and feelings are rather mixed." When breaking the news to her eldest daughter, Crown Princess Victoria of Prussia, Queen Victoria simply said: "The murder is out."

Dowry

Tsar Alexander II granted his daughter the then staggering sum of £100,000 as a dowry, plus an annual allowance of £32,000. He also bestowed on his only daughter some of the best jewels owned by the Romanovs, including the sapphires he had inherited from his mother, Empress Alexandra Feodorovna and a parure that had belonged to Catherine the Great. As a wedding present, the Tsar commissioned a complete parure of diamonds and Burmese rubies from the court jeweller Bolin. Her other pieces of jewellery included a tiara russe made of diamonds, which could also be worn as a necklace. George Greville, 4th Earl of Warwick later recalled that "I saw the finest jewels I have ever seen in my life" when he visited Maria's home in Eastwell and that "One would have thought that the world had been ransacked to lay these treasures at the Duchess’s feet, and there seemed to be enough for an entire royal family rather than for one member of it.” Alexander II gave Maria an extravagant trousseau that cost £40,000: It included "50 magnificent dresses, not including ball-dresses, to say nothing of the splendid furs and lace at 1,000 roubles a yard." He made Alfred honorary chief of a Russian guards regiment and even named a Russian battleship after him – the Herzog Edinburgsky.

A week after the engagement, the proposed Anglo-Russo alliance experienced its first crisis. Queen Victoria asked the Tsar to bring Maria to Scotland, so that she could meet her future daughter-in-law. Alexander II refused. The Tsarina suggested that they all meet in Cologne, instead. The Queen called it "simply impertinent" that "I ... who have been nearly twenty years longer on the throne than the Emperor of Russia ... and who am a Reigning Sovereign ... should be ready to run to the slightest call of the mighty Russians ... like any little Princess." Victoria also made herself unpopular by refusing the Tsar's offer to make the Prince of Wales colonel of a Russian regiment, and by demanding that an Anglican marriage service be held in St Petersburg alongside the Orthodox ceremony. But Maria Alexandrovna looked forward happily to her marriage: "How happy I am to belong to him. I feel that my love for him is growing daily. I have a feeling of peace and inexpressible happiness and a boundless impatience to be altogether his own."

Marriage

On 4 January 1874, Alfred arrived in St Petersburg for the wedding and stayed in the Winter Palace. The other British guests arrived on 18 January. Queen Victoria was represented by her eldest son Albert Edward, Prince of Wales, and his wife Alexandra, Princess of Wales, sister of Tsarevna Maria Feodorovna of Russia. The Queen's eldest daughter, Victoria, and her husband Frederick, Crown Prince of Germany, were present as well.

The marriage ceremony consisted of two parts. The Orthodox service took place first and was performed by the Metropolitans of St Petersburg, Moscow, and Kiev in the Imperial Chapel. Grand Dukes Vladimir, Alexis, and Sergei and the groom's brother Prince Arthur, Duke of Connaught and Strathearn, relieved each other taking turns holding the golden crowns over the head of the bride and groom. Maria wore a glittering coronet and a mantle of crimson velvet trimmed with ermine and a sprig of myrtle, specially sent by Queen Victoria. Alfred wore the uniform of the Royal Navy. The Tsar looked pale throughout the entire ceremony and said afterwards: "It is for her happiness, but the light of my life has gone out." After this, the bride and groom each drank thrice from a goblet of wine. The service concluded with the couple joining hands under the priest's stole. Then they all proceeded to the Alexander Hall, where Arthur Stanley, Dean of Westminster, made Prince Alfred and Maria Alexandrovna husband and wife according to the rites of the Church of England. The two services were followed by a banquet at the palace. The famous opera singer Adelina Patti sang for the guests. The evening ended with a ball at St George Hall.

In London that night, Queen Victoria wore the Order of St Catherine on her dress and drank a toast to the young couple. Those members of her court who had traveled to St Petersburg were overwhelmed by the scale of the celebrations, receptions and entertainments marking the Anglo-Russian marriage. Major-General Sir Howard Elphinstone noted that, in one room, supper was served to five hundred people at fifty different tables, with "palms and exotics ... used to so large an extent that it gives the place the appearance of a conservatory ... the heat of the rooms was almost unbearable, and several ladies left the ballroom in a fainting state." Lady Augusta Stanley summed up the wedding in three words: "What a day."

Alfred and Maria spent their wedding night at the Alexander Palace in Tsarskoe Selo. Alexander II had ordered a lavish honeymoon suite on the ground floor, hoping that it would persuade the young couple to remain in Russia. After a short honeymoon in Tsarskoe Selo, however, Alfred and Maria left Russia to live in England. Alexander II never lost hope that they would return, and the honeymoon suite was kept preserved for the couple for two decades. In 1894, it became the bedroom of the last Tsar and his wife, Nicholas II and Alexandra, who were Maria's nephew and Alfred's niece respectively.

Duchess of Edinburgh

Arrival in England

The Duke and Duchess of Edinburgh arrived in England on 7 March 1874. The town of Windsor was decorated in their honour, with Union Jacks and Russian flags, and Maria was given a great welcome by the waiting crowds. Queen Victoria met them at the South-Western Station and recorded their arrival in her journal: "I took dear Marie in my arms and kissed her warmly several times. I was quite nervous and trembling, so long had I been in expectation ... Dear Marie has a very friendly manner, a pleasant face, beautiful skin and fine bright eyes ... She speaks English wonderfully well." Later on, Queen Victoria described her new daughter-in-law as "most pleasing natural, unaffected and civil" even if "she was not pretty or graceful and held herself badly". "I have formed a high opinion of her," Queen Victoria reported, impressed with "her wonderfully even, cheerful, satisfied temper – her kind and indulgent disposition, free from bigotry and intolerance, and her serious, intelligent mind – so entirely free from everything fast – and so full of occupation and interest in everything, makes her a most agreeable companion. Everyone must like her." The queen also noted that Marie was "not a bit afraid of Affie and I hope will have the very best influence upon him."

The Duke and Duchess of Edinburgh made their public entry into London on 12 March. Thousands lined the route from Paddington Station to Buckingham Palace to take a glimpse of the new British Princess Alfred and Maria moved into Clarence House in London, which was their main residence in England. Here she had an Orthodox Chapel installed for her and the Russian priest she had brought from St Petersburg. In addition, they had a country residence, Eastwell Park, a large estate of 2,500 acres near Ashford in Kent, where the Duke enjoyed shooting parties. To alleviate his daughter's homesickness, the Tsar and his son Grand Duke Alexei paid a family visit to England in May 1874.

The Duchess and Queen Victoria

Maria Alexandrovna often squabbled with her mother-in-law on how she should be addressed at court. As the Tsar's only daughter, she was an Imperial Highness had precedence over all the grand duchesses in Russia. Once she married her husband she was only entitled to the style of Royal Highness. Tsar Alexander II alleged that his daughter should continue to be styled as an Imperial Highness, not royal, "as in all civilized countries". Queen Victoria replied that she did not care whether imperial was used or not, as long as royal came first. There was also the added problem that Maria was both Duchess of Edinburgh and Grand Duchess of Russia, and which title should be written first was a controversial matter. In retaliation for the quarrel over precedence, the Duchess of Edinburgh took great pleasure in showing off her magnificent jewellery. The English princesses were clearly jealous of her diamonds, as was Queen Victoria. Meriel Buchanan, daughter of the last British ambassador to Imperial Russia, described Maria's first Drawing Room: "The Queen compared the Duchess’s tiara with those of her own daughters, shrugging her shoulders like a bird whose plumage has been ruffled, her mouth drawn down at the corners, in an expression which those who knew her had learned to dread."

When she visited Scotland, Maria Alexandrovna was frozen in her unheated bedroom in Balmoral Castle and ordered a fire to be lit. When she was out, Queen Victoria entered the room and ordered a maid to throw water on the fire and open all the windows.

Maria Alexandrovna's relationship with her mother-in-law deteriorated. She wrote letters to her father describing Queen Victoria as a "silly obstinate old fool". Her mother Marie of Hesse and by Rhine was angry with Queen Victoria and wrote, "To be quite frank, it is difficult to take such a mother-in-law seriously, and I am sorry on Marie's account." Her daughter Queen Marie of Romania reflected that, "I do not think my mother always found it easy being Queen Victoria's daughter-in-law, though they had great respect for each other."

Maria Alexandrovna was angry that Queen Victoria opposed the marriage of Princess Elisabeth of Hesse and by Rhine to her favorite brother Grand Duke Sergei Alexandrovich of Russia. In August 1883, she wrote, "that happy and so entirely satisfactory... prospect of marriage of my brother Sergei is going I think to fall through, under the deplorable influence of the Queen... I knew that from the start she set her heart against it saying that she had only heard his praise, but he had the greatest of all misfortunes, he was Russian and she had enough of one Russian in the family (meaning me, of course)."

At the British Court
Maria Alexandrovna had five children. Nine months after their marriage, she gave birth to her first child and only son, young Alfred, in Buckingham Palace on 15 October 1874. Her mother came to London to visit her daughter during her confinement and to meet her grandson. She gave birth to her second child and first daughter on 29 October 1875 at Eastwell Park, whom she named Marie after herself and her mother. Maria shocked English society by nursing the children herself. While the Duchess was in Malta with her husband, who was stationed there as an officer in the Royal Navy, Maria Alexandrovna gave birth to her third child and second daughter, Victoria Melita, on 25 November 1876. On 1 September 1878, she gave birth to her fourth child and third daughter Alexandra. On 20 April 1884, she gave birth to her fifth child and fourth daughter, Beatrice at Eastwell. Years later, she lamented that she only had five children: "The only real heavenly moment is the birth of the child. This cannot be compared to anything else. I think if I had even a dozen children, I would have kept the same feeling."

The family's main residence in England was Clarence House, in London. Autumns, Christmas and new year were spent at Eastwell Park, a country estate they leased in Kent. On summer holidays, the family went to Osborne Cottage on the Isle of Wight.

In 1877, Russia went to war with Turkey in an attempt to gain control of the Balkans. Queen Victoria sent Tsar Alexander II a series of aggressive telegrams that almost led to a state of war between the two countries. The Duchess was deeply shocked at her mother-in-law's hostility towards her country and her own father in particular.

Maria found it difficult to settle at the British Court. Her mother Marie of Hesse and by Rhine wrote that "Marie thinks London hideous... the air there appalling, the English food abominable, the later hours very tiring, the visits to Windsor and Osborne boring beyond belief." Maria described London as "an impossible place, where people are mad of pleasure" and a let down compared to the broad streets, golden domes, and magnificent palaces of Saint Petersburg. In her eyes, Buckingham Palace and Windsor Castle could never compete with the splendours of the Winter Palace. Constant visits to her mother-in-law at Windsor Castle and Osborne in the Isle of Wight were tedious. Although she loved music, the duchess did not like the Royal Albert Hall, describing it as "all ecclesiastical and ... quite boring ... Every concert goes on for several hours". During a banquet at Marlborough house, she had a conversation with the Prime Minister, Benjamin Disraeli. When Disraeli identified his rival, she exclaimed, "What a strange state society is in here. Wherever I go there is a double. Two Prime Ministers, two Secretaries of State, two Lord Chamberlains, and two Lord Chancellors."

Maria disliked her in-laws. The Queen's company was oppressive, and her husband was a philanderer. Of her sisters and brothers-in-law, she only cared for the two youngest: Prince Leopold and Princess Beatrice. Proud of her strong intellect, she considered Alexandra, the Princess of Wales, a light-minded and foolish woman.

Maria became increasingly homesick for Russia and was happy for any excuse to return there. She spoke of her “Russian heart" and said that "every sympathetic voice from the Fatherland is sacred to me." Her daughter Marie of Romania reflected that "my mother dearly loved her native country, and she never really felt completely happy in England."

British people thought her rough and masculine in her manners. Her imperious attitude towards her servants and her defiance of English convention by smoking in public made her unpopular. She made it equally plain that she did not care what people thought.

The Duke of Edinburgh was the heir of his childless uncle Ernest II, Duke of Saxe-Coburg, the eldest brother of Prince Albert. After the Russo-Turkish War of 1877–1878, for a long while, Maria Alexandrovna resided in Coburg, as her husband was expected to succeed his aging uncle. While in Germany, a third daughter, Alexandra, was born on 1 September 1878 at Rosenau Castle, in Coburg. On 13 October 1879 the Duchess gave birth prematurely to a stillborn son at Eastwell Park. On 17 February 1880, Maria was back in Russia, during the 25th anniversary celebration of her father's coronation. That day, radicals attempted to assassinate the Tsar and the entire Imperial family. A terrorist bomb demolished the dining room and the guard room at the Winter Palace. Maria Alexandrovna returned to Russia again in June 1880, to be with her dying mother. She was back in England at Clarence House when her father was killed by a terrorist bomb. Maria Alexandrovna had to rush back to Russia to attend her father's funeral in Saint Petersburg in March 1881.
The Duke and Duchess of Edinburgh were present at the coronation of her brother, Tsar Alexander III, in Moscow in May 1883. In July 1884, they traveled to Ilinskoe, outside Moscow, to visit Maria's younger brother Grand Duke Sergei, who had married Queen Victoria's granddaughter Princess Elisabeth of Hesse and by Rhine.

Alfred was heir to the Duchy of Saxe-Coburg and Gotha. Expecting to be the Duchess there, Maria Alexandrovna had a palace built for her family in Coburg. The building, known as the Edinburgh Palais, was built across the central square from the Ehrenburg Palace, the official residence of the reigning duke, and next to the town's opera hall. The royal couple's rooms were on the second floor, while the bedrooms of the four young princesses were on the third floor. Both the Duke and Duchess of Edinburgh were avid collectors. In the Edinburgh Palais, there were many objects that reminded Maria Alexandrovna of her homeland. As a reminder of Russia, Maria Alexandrovna organised entertainment in the Russian fashion.

In Malta

 
In January 1886, the Duke was appointed commander-in-chief of the British Mediterranean Fleet, based in Malta. In October 1886, the family settled there. For the next three years, they spent every winter at the San Anton Palace in Malta. Life in the island was unexciting for the Duchess of Edinburgh, but it was a welcome respite from living in England. While in Malta, the Duchess proved to be an excellent hostess, entertaining naval officers and their wives. In 1887, the couple returned briefly to London to take part in Queen Victoria's Golden Jubilee. Her husband's career in the British navy and their many relations in the European courts allowed Maria Alexandrovna to travel extensively, something that she truly enjoyed. She visited most European countries, including Spain, Italy, the Netherlands, Greece, and even Montenegro, making annual trips to Germany, England, and Russia.

Duchess of Saxe-Coburg and Gotha

In Devonport

In March 1887, the Duke relinquished his command of the Mediterranean Fleet, and the family moved to Coburg. Their main residence was the Palais Edinburgh, where the Duchess held court. Her husband, occupied with his naval affairs, was away most of the time. Responsibility for the education of the couple's five children fell upon the Duchess. She was a strict, but devoted mother who made sure to be the most important person in her children's lives. Between August 1890 and June 1893, the Duke was stationed at the Royal Navy's base in Devonport. Maria Alexandrovna did not care for the Admiralty House, her husband's official residence, and only made rare visits to Devonport with her children.

With the passing of the years, Alfred and Maria grew apart. They had little in common other than a shared interest in music and their children. He was reserved, taciturn, moody, ill-tempered, and a heavy drinker. By the mid-1880s he was an alcoholic. The Duke was described as "rude, touchy, willful, unscrupulous, improvident, and unfaithful." The Duchess resented her husband's attitude, but kept her marriage going, hiding her troubled married life from her children, providing a happy environment for them. She later confessed to one of her daughters that she felt she was never anything more than her husband's "legitimate mistress". Arguments over their children added to the couple's marital problems. The Duke hoped that their eldest daughter, Marie, would marry his nephew, the future King George V. The Duchess, however, was determined that her daughter should avoid her mistake, and married her instead to Crown Prince Ferdinand of Romania on 10 January 1893.

In Coburg and Gotha

On the death of his uncle, Ernst II, Duke of Saxe-Coburg and Gotha, on 22 August 1893, the Duke of Edinburgh inherited the vacant throne (his elder brother the Prince of Wales had deferred his right to the succession). Upon her husband's ascension to the Ducal throne, Maria Alexandrovna became Duchess of Saxe-Coburg and Gotha, in addition to being Duchess of Edinburgh. Unlike her husband, disgruntled to leave his career in the navy, Maria Alexandrovna thoroughly enjoyed her new role. She found the country "charming" and the prospect of "a new fine position, with plenty to do" a "real God-send". Known for its hunting forest and picturesque castles, the ducal estate was small, compromising separate lands in Coburg, Gotha, Upper Austria, and Tyrol, but there she could live according to her desires in a domain of her own. The family moved to Schloss Ehrenburg, the Duke's official residence, but they all preferred their summer house, Schloss Rosenau, a gingerbread-yellow villa on a hill with views of the surrounding countryside. They also had two residences in Gotha, where they had to live part of the year: Schloss Friedenstein and Schloss Reinhardsbrunn, which the Duke enjoyed for its hunting grounds. The Duchess took on updating the badly furnished castles, and also charitable works, opening an establishment for those with intellectual disabilities that bore her name. Her passions were the opera and the theater, which she supported both in Coburg and in Gotha. The Duchess was also an avid reader and enjoyed mushroom hunting.

Alfred and Maria's second daughter, Victoria Melita, married Ernest Louis, Grand Duke of Hesse on 19 April 1894. The Duchess was initially against this match as Ernest was close to his British grandmother, Queen Victoria, who arrived at Coburg with many other royals for the wedding. In November 1894, Marie's eldest brother, Tsar Alexander III, died of nephritis, aged forty-nine, leaving his twenty-six-year-old son, Nicholas II, as the new Tsar. Alfred and Maria went to Russia, arriving just before Alexander III's death. They stayed on in Saint Petersburg for the wedding of Nicholas to his fiancée, Princess Alix of Hesse-Darmstadt, the youngest surviving daughter of Alfred's deceased sister, Princess Alice.

Over her husband's objections, the Duchess arranged the marriage of her third daughter, Alexandra, in September 1895, to Prince Ernest of Hohenlohe-Langenburg, a grandson of Queen Victoria's half-sister Feodora. He was an attaché at the German Embassy in London and his family was mediatized but not a reigning royal family. The Duchess's main concern was her wayward only son, "Young Alfred", who had a checkered career in the German army. On 15 October 1895, he reached his majority, but he was already in bad health. Alexandra's wedding took place in Coburg in April 1896, and the following month, Maria Alexandrovna travelled to Russia with her husband and their other four children for Tsar Nicholas II's coronation in Moscow. In June 1897, the Duchess and her husband went back to London to take part in Queen Victoria's Diamond Jubilee. By then, the couple's relationship had deteriorated further. Maria Alexandrovna despaired in finding a topic of conversation with her difficult husband as he hated her interest in literature and the theater, while she found his fondness for politics and hunting "dull". The Duchess was relieved when her husband was away. She wrote to her eldest daughter "if only you knew how easy and comfortable life is without him." By 1898, the Duke's health had deteriorated, exacerbated by his excessive smoking and heavy drinking.

Family tragedies

On 23 January 1899 Maria Alexandrovna and her husband celebrated their 25th wedding anniversary at Friedenstein Palace, the Duke's official residence in Gotha. Absent from the festivities was their only son, who was gravely ill. Young Alfred was a junior officer in Potsdam, where his chief hobbies were gambling, drinking and womanizing. He had contracted syphilis in 1892, and by 1898, his health deteriorated rapidly. He died at the age of twenty-four on 6 February 1899 in Meran, after reportedly shooting himself at Gotha during his parents' wedding anniversary celebrations. The Duke was heartbroken at young Alfred's death. This tragedy drove the parents farther apart as Alfred blamed his wife, who had been responsible for young Alfred's education. In her grief, the Duchess sank to her knees sobbing uncontrollably during her son's funeral. With the death of Young Alfred, the heir to the Duchy of Saxe-Coburg and Gotha was Alfred's nephew Charles Edward, Duke of Albany, who came to Germany to be educated there. The succession to the Duchy was complicated by the news that Alfred himself had cancer of the throat, too advanced for any treatment. By May 1900, he was unable to swallow and could only be fed by a tube. The Duchess and their youngest daughter, Beatrice, who were in England visiting Queen Victoria, returned on 17 July, unaware of the seriousness of the Duke's condition. On 30 July 1900, he died in his sleep at Schloss Rosenau in Coburg.  Maria Alexandrovna was at his bedside with their daughters Victoria Melita, Alexandra, and Beatrice. Maria became Dowager Duchess of Saxe-Coburg and Gotha. The duchy went to Alfred's nephew Charles Edward, then sixteen years old. During his minority the regency fell on Maria's son-in-law, Ernest of Hohenlohe-Langenburg, for nearly five years.

Last years

Maria Alexandrovna was only forty-six years old when she became a widow. After the death of her husband, she stayed, for a while, in England, where she had to relinquish Clarence House which was inherited by her brother-in-law, the Duke of Connaught. Maria Alexandrovna was at Osborne during the final days of her mother-in law, Queen Victoria. In her widowhood, Maria Alexandrovna kept the Edinburgh Palace as her home in Coburg, and Schloss Friedenstein in Gotha. Schloss Rosenau served as her country residence. However, she spent most of her time at her villa in Tegernsee overlooking a lake in Bavaria, near Munich. Her winter residence was the Château de Fabron, near Nice. The upkeep of five residences put a strain on her finances.

Although she was critical of her daughters, she supported them during their personal crisis. In 1901, her second daughter Victoria Melita divorced her husband and came to live with her. On 25 September 1905, Victoria Melita married her maternal first cousin, Grand Duke Kiril Vladimirovich of Russia. The Dowager Duchess's relationship with her nephew Tsar Nicholas II deteriorated, as he opposed Victoria Melita's second marriage, and it doomed the romance between Princess Beatrice and his younger brother, Grand Duke Michael Alexandrovich because they too were first cousins.

Maria Alexandrovna lamented that, after working hard for the Duchy of Saxe-Coburg, and clearing its finances, the duchy passed to Charles Edward who took control of the Duchy at his majority in July 1905. Relations with the new Duke were initially tense, but improved when Charles Edward provided his full support to the marriage of Maria Alexandrovna's youngest daughter, Princess Beatrice to Alfonso de Orleans y Borbón, Infante of Spain on 15 July 1909. In the following years, Grand Duchess Maria Alexandrovna continued to make frequent trips to her native Russia in order to stay with her daughter, Victoria Melita, Grand Duchess of Russia. The last one of her trips took place in May 1914.

At the outbreak of World War I, Maria Alexandrovna was in Coburg after returning from a visit to King George V in Buckingham Palace. Her sympathies were divided, but she sided with Germany against her native Russia. The Coburg family faced intense hostility during the war for their British and Russian connections. The Dowager Duchess' position in Coburg became untenable as Russophobia took over the German Empire. To avoid complications, Maria Alexandrovna stayed away from Coburg, retiring to Tegernsee in Bavaria. At one point, while she was returning home with her two younger daughters, their car was stopped by an angry mob who recognised her and harassed her for her Russian heritage. It took the police over an hour to extricate them from the situation. After that incident Maria Alexandrovna went to live in exile in Switzerland at the Walhaus, an annex of the Dolder Grand Hotel in Zürich.

In August 1917 she wrote: "At the age of 63, I am very fresh in mind, if not in body, and I can support with patience and resignation a sad and perhaps miserable end of life which is in store for my old age... Sometimes I also seem to despair, but not about myself, but about the state of things in general." Many of her relatives were killed during the Russian revolution, including her only surviving brother Grand Duke Paul and her nephew Tsar Nicholas II with his immediate family. In the aftermath of the war, the Dowager Duchess lost her large fortune as the bulk of it was held in trust in Russia. Her British income was small, and as she never saw a penny of it, she was forced to sell a great part of her jewellery collection.

Living under reduced circumstances in Zürich, Maria Alexandrovna was reunited with her two eldest daughters Marie, Queen of Romania, and Victoria Melita, Grand Duchess of Russia who had been on the opposite side during the war. In July 1920, she wrote: "I am too utterly disgusted with the present state of the world and mankind in general... They have destroyed and ruined my beloved Russia, my much-loved Germany." She was a broken woman, her figure, always plump, became thin and her hands trembling. Although she had been affected by gastric troubles, her death came unexpectedly. Eight days after her sixty-seventh birthday, on 25 October 1920, she died in her sleep of a heart attack. "She was profoundly religious," her eldest daughter wrote, "I hope God will not disappoint her as most things and beings did in this life."

Archives
Maria Alexandrovna's letters to her third daughter, Alexandra, are preserved in the Hohenlohe Central Archive (Hohenlohe-Zentralarchiv Neuenstein) in Neuenstein Castle in the town of Neuenstein, Baden-Württemberg, Germany.

Honours
 : Dame Grand Cross of the Order of St. Catherine, 17 October 1853
 :
 Royal Order of Victoria and Albert, 1st Class
 Companion of the Order of the Crown of India, 1 January 1878
 Lady of Justice of the Venerable Order of St. John
 : Dame of the Order of Louise, 1st Class
  Hesse and by Rhine: Dame of the Order of the Golden Lion, 1 May 1896
 : Dame of the Order of Queen Maria Luisa, 20 May 1888
 : Dame of the Order of Queen Saint Isabel, 28 February 1894

Issue

Ancestry

See also
Marie biscuit

Notes

References
 Abrash, Merritt. A Curious Royal Romance: The Queen's Son and the Tsar's Daughter. Published in The Slavonic and East European Review, vol. 47, no. 109. 1969, pp. 389–400. 
 Beéche, Arthur E. The Coburgs of Europe. Eurohistory.com, 2014. 
 Buchanan, Meriel. Queen Victoria's relations. Cassell, 1954. ASIN: B001X6ANSY
Corti, Egon César. The Downfall of Three Dynasties. Methuen, 1934. ASIN: B000866QH2
Cowles, Virginia. The Romanovs. Harper & Ross, 1971. 
 Gilbert, Paul. My Russia: The Children's Island, Alexander Park, Tsarkoye Selo.  Published in Royal Russia: a Celebration of the Romanov Dynasty & Imperial Russia in Words & Photographs. No 4. Gilbert's Books, 2013. 
 Gilbert, Paul. Alexander II and Tsarkoe Selo.  Published in Royal Russia Annual: a Celebration of the Romanov Dynasty & Imperial Russia in Words & Photographs.  No 2. Gilbert's Books, 2012. 
 Gelardi, Julia P. From Splendor to Revolution: The Romanov Women 1847–1928.  St Martin Press, 2011. 
 King, Greg & Wilson, Penny. The Romanovs Adrift: The Russian Imperial Family in 1913–1919. Eurohistory and Kensington House Books. 2018. 
Korneva, Galina & Cheboksarova, Tatiana.  Russia & Europe: Dynastic Ties . Eurohistory, 2013. 
Golden, Robert. Royal Ephemera - Part 2. Published in Royalty Digest Quarterly  2008 N 2. 
 Mandache, Diana. Always Imperial. Published in Majesty Magazine. Vol 31 No 10
 Mandache, Diana. Dearest Missy. Rosvall Royal Books, 2011, 
 Nelipa, Margarita. Alexander III His Life and Reign.  Gilbert's Books, 2014. 
 Pakula, Hannah. The Last Romantic: A Biography of Queen Marie of Roumania . Simon & Schuster, 1984  
 Papi, Stefano. Jewels of the Romanovs: Family & Court  . Thames & Hudson, 2013. 
 Perry, John and Pleshakov, Constantine. The Flight of the Romanovs. Basic Books, 1999, .
 Sullivan, Michael John. A Fatal Passion: The Story of the Uncrowned Last Empress of Russia, Random House, 1997, 
 Van der Kiste, John. Alfred: Queen Victoria's Second Son. Fonthill Media, 2015. .(Kindle ed.).
 Van der Kiste, John. The Romanovs 1818–1959. Sutton Publishing, 1999. .
 Wimbles, John. The Daughter of Tsar Alexander II.  Published in The Grand Duchesses. Eurohistory.com, 2014.
 Zeepvat, Charlotte. The Camera and the Tsars, Sutton Publishing, 2004. .
 Zeepvat, Charlotte. Romanov Autumn: stories from the last century of Imperial Russia. Sutton Publishing, 2000. 

1853 births
1920 deaths
19th-century people from the Russian Empire
20th-century Russian people
19th-century women from the Russian Empire
20th-century Russian women
Wives of British princes
Duchesses of Saxe-Coburg and Gotha
House of Holstein-Gottorp-Romanov
House of Saxe-Coburg and Gotha (United Kingdom)
Duchesses of Edinburgh
Russian grand duchesses
Companions of the Order of the Crown of India
Dames of Justice of the Order of St John
Ladies of the Royal Order of Victoria and Albert
People associated with the Royal National College for the Blind
Burials at the Ducal Family Mausoleum, Glockenburg Cemetery, Coburg
Dames of the Order of Saint Isabel
Daughters of Russian emperors
Children of Alexander II of Russia